Since the 1992 tournament, male squads have been required to consist of players under 23 years old; since the 1996 tournament, a maximum of three players over the age of 23 have been allowed per squad.

This is a list of all-time overage players (also known as wild card players in some countries) in Olympic football since the 1996 tournament.

Overage players rule in Olympic football have influenced other competitions like Asian Games football and Pan American Games football.

Africa (CAF)

Algeria 
Overage players of Algeria national under-23 football team

Cameroon 
Overage players of Cameroon national under-23 football team

Egypt 
Overage players of Egypt national under-23 football team

Gabon 
Overage players of Gabon national under-23 football team

Ghana 
Overage players of Ghana national under-23 football team

Ivory Coast 
Overage players of Ivory Coast national under-23 football team

Mali 
Overage players of Mali national under-23 football team

Morocco 
Overage players of Morocco national under-23 football team

Nigeria 
Overage players of Nigeria national under-23 football team

Senegal 
Overage players of Senegal national under-23 football team

South Africa 
Overage players of South Africa national under-23 football team

Tunisia 
Overage players of Tunisia national under-23 football team

Asia (AFC)

Australia 
Overage players of Australia men's national under-23 soccer team

China 
Overage players of China national under-23 football team

Iraq 
Overage players of Iraq national under-23 football team

Japan 
Overage players of Japan national under-23 football team

Kuwait 
Overage players of Kuwait national under-23 football team

Saudi Arabia 
Overage players of Saudi Arabia national under-23 football team

South Korea 
Overage players of South Korea national under-23 football team

United Arab Emirates 
Overage players of United Arab Emirates national under-23 football team

Europe (UEFA)

Belarus 
Overage players of Belarus national under-23 football team

Belgium 
Overage players of Belgium national under-21 football team

Czech Republic 
Overage players of Czech Republic national under-21 football team

Denmark 
Overage players of Denmark national under-21 football team

France 
Overage players of France Olympic football team

Great Britain 
Overage players of Great Britain men's Olympic football team

Greece 
Overage players of Greece national under-23 football team

Germany 
Overage players of Germany Olympic football team

Hungary 
Overage players of Hungary national under-21 football team

Italy 
Overage players of Italy national under-21 football team

Netherlands 
Overage players of Netherlands national under-21 football team

Portugal 
Overage players of Portugal Olympic football team

Romania 
Overage players of Romania national under-21 football team

Serbia 
Overage players of Serbia national under-21 football team

Slovakia 
Overage players of Slovakia national under-21 football team

Spain 
Overage players of Spain national under-23 football team

Sweden 
Overage players of Sweden national under-23 football team

Switzerland 
Overage players of Switzerland national under-23 football team

North America, Central America and Caribbean (CONCACAF)

Costa Rica 
Overage players of Costa Rica national under-23 football team

Honduras 
Overage players of Honduras national under-23 football team

Mexico 
Overage players of Mexico national under-23 football team

United States 
Overage players of United States men's national under-23 soccer team

Oceania (OFC)

Fiji
Overage players of Fiji national under-23 football team

New Zealand
Overage players of New Zealand national under-23 football team

South America (CONMEBOL)

Argentina 
Overage players of Argentina national under-23 football team

Brazil 
Overage players of Brazil national under-23 football team

Chile 
Overage players of Chile Olympic football team

Colombia 
Overage players of Colombia national under-23 football team

Paraguay 
Overage players of Paraguay national under-23 football team

Uruguay 
Overage players of Uruguay national under-23 football team

References 

Match reports at FIFA.com
Squads at FIFA.com

External links